Mariya Prusakova (born 25 December 1989) is a Russian snowboarder. She competed in the women's halfpipe event at the 2006 Winter Olympics.

References

External links
 

1989 births
Living people
Russian female snowboarders
Olympic snowboarders of Russia
Snowboarders at the 2006 Winter Olympics
Sportspeople from Moscow